Bacterioplanes is a bacteria genus from the family of Oceanospirillaceae, with one known species (Bacterioplanes sanyensis).

References

Oceanospirillales
Monotypic bacteria genera
Bacteria genera